The 1590 siege of Hachigata was the penultimate battle of Toyotomi Hideyoshi's campaigns against the Hōjō clan, during Japan's Sengoku period. Hachigata was one of the last major fortresses of the Hōjō, whose opposition in the Kantō region Hideyoshi sought to eliminate, having already subjugated all of Western Japan. 

The besieging force of 35,000 men was led by Maeda Toshiie and Uesugi Kagekatsu. The Hōjō garrison under the command of Hōjō Ujikuni held out for over a month before the castle fell.

See also
Siege of Hachigata (1568)

References

1590 in Japan
Hachigata 1590
Conflicts in 1590
Hachigata 1590